Rockford is a city in Wright and Hennepin counties in the U.S. state of Minnesota.  The population was 4,316 at the 2010 census. While Rockford is mainly located within Wright County, a small part of the city extends into Hennepin County. It is part of the Minneapolis–Saint Paul metropolitan statistical area.  Minnesota State Highway 55 serves as a main route in the city.

History
Prior to the founding of what is today Rockford, Native Americans inhabited the area. 

Mounds anywhere from 500 to 1500 years old can be found, as well as a trail dating just as long that runs under the Bridge Street Bridge on the Hennepin County side. 

The area was a natural border land between the Ojibwe and Dakota, and was good hunting and wintering grounds to the tribes that could come and go. It officially belonged to the Dakotas. The closest Objibwe village was over in Dayton, on the Crow.

As Wisconsin became settled, the Winnebago were pushed west and set up camp in Rockford. There was discussion about creating a reservation for them at the spot, but late 1840s Minneapolis was booming and those folks didn’t want a reservation so close. 

After the Treaty Traverse de Sioux in 1851, the land was open to white settlers. Surveying was completed in 1854, and plots became available. The Winnebago were still here; George Florida wrote a memory of skating with the Native children on the Crow River.

In 1855,  brothers-in-law George F. Ames and Joel Florida of Illinois came up the Crow River with carpenter Guildford D. George with hopes of starting a mill town. Eventually the town would boast multiple thriving mills: a lumber, a flour, and a saw mill. 

1858 brought the Wright County War and the first US troops called to Minnesota.  

A stockade was built in town during the Dakota Uprising of 1862, and again during a little scare in 1863.

Rockford was incorporated in 1881. The railroad went through town in 1886.

Geography

The Crow River is formed at Rockford by the confluence of its North and South Forks.

Demographics

2010 census
As of the census of 2010, there were 4,316 people, 1,622 households, and 1,147 families living in the city. The racial makeup of the city was 94.1% White, 1.0% African American, 0.5% Native American, 1.3% Asian, 0.5% from other races, and 2.5% from two or more races. Hispanic or Latino of any race were 1.9% of the population.

There were 1,622 households, of which 40.3% had children under the age of 18 living with them, 52.7% were married couples living together, 11.2% had a female householder with no husband present, 6.8% had a male householder with no wife present, and 29.3% were non-families. 22.1% of all households were made up of individuals, and 5.5% had someone living alone who was 65 years of age or older. The average household size was 2.66 and the average family size was 3.13.

The median age in the city was 34.7 years. 28.5% of residents were under the age of 18; 7.5% were between the ages of 18 and 24; 31.3% were from 25 to 44; 26% were from 45 to 64; and 6.6% were 65 years of age or older. The gender makeup of the city was 49.4% male and 50.6% female.

2000 census
As of the census of 2000, there were 3,484 people, 1,296 households, and 929 families living in the city. The racial makeup of the city was 97.56% White, 0.40% African American, 0.52% Native American, 0.46% Asian, 0.09% Pacific Islander, 0.14% from other races, and 0.83% from two or more races. Hispanic or Latino of any race were 1.00% of the population. 38.1% were of German, 15.0% Norwegian, 8.4% Irish and 6.1% Swedish ancestry.

There were 1,296 households, out of which 44.1% had children under the age of 18 living with them, 55.2% were married couples living together, 11.7% had a female householder with no husband present, and 28.3% were non-families. 21.8% of all households were made up of individuals, and 4.2% had someone living alone who was 65 years of age or older.  The average household size was 2.69 and the average family size was 3.17.

In the city, the population was spread out, with 31.9% under the age of 18, 7.7% from 18 to 24, 39.0% from 25 to 44, 16.7% from 45 to 64, and 4.8% who were 65 years of age or older.  The median age was 31 years. For every 100 females, there were 99.9 males.

The median income for a household in the city was $51,349, and the median income for a family was $56,607. Males had a median income of $37,112 versus $29,395 for females. The per capita income for the city was $20,675.  About 6.5% of families and 6.5% of the population were below the poverty line, including 8.8% of those under age 18 and 13.4% of those age 65 or over.

Education
The main school district is Rockford Public Schools.  They include an elementary school (grades preschool to 4th grade) a middle school (grades 5 through 8) and a high school (9th through 12th). The elementary focuses mainly on an arts program, while the middle and high schools put more of an emphasis on technology.  The high school has, for the past four years, scored higher than the state average in mathematics. Originally, the Rockford School District was established by the Wright county commissioners on September 6, 1856 and the first school house was constructed by 1860. During the 1960s the school underwent redistricting that gave its current designation as Independent School District # 883.

Notable people
Ivan R. Gates, an American aviator and businessman born in Rockford
Joel McKinnon Miller, an American actor born in Rockford

References

External links

 City of Rockford – Official Website

Cities in Minnesota
Cities in Hennepin County, Minnesota
Cities in Wright County, Minnesota